On Air is a 2008 South Korean television series, starring Kim Ha-neul, Park Yong-ha, Lee Beom-soo and Song Yoon-ah.  The series is a behind-the-scenes look at a fictional television drama, revealing details about what normally goes on behind a TV drama production. It aired on SBS from March 5 to May 15, 2008 on Wednesdays and Thursdays at 21:55 for 21 episodes.

Synopsis
Jang Ki-joon (Lee Beom-soo) used to be a top manager in the business but he went bankrupt as he couldn't compete with other powerful agencies. He was 'rescued' by Oh Seung-ah (Kim Ha-neul), a top star who agreed to join his agency after breaking off with her former one. Lee Kyung-min (Park Yong-ha) is a drama PD who gets his first chance at being a director. Seo Young-eun (Song Yoon-ah) is a much sought-after scriptwriter who is divorced and has a young son. On Air revolves around these four entertainment industry figures - a director, a writer, an actress, and her manager - as their personal and professional lives intertwine during the shooting of a drama. It also portrays how the whole production team and performers complete a project in a tight schedule as well as how actors, actresses, and entertainment agencies handle rumors surrounding them.

Cast

Main
 Kim Ha-neul as Oh Seung-ah
 Park Yong-ha as Lee Kyung-min
 Lee Beom-soo as Jang Ki-joon
 Song Yoon-ah as Seo Young-eun

Supporting

Lee Hyung-chul as Jin Sang-woo (SW Entertainment president)
Han Ye-won as Cherry
Hong Ji-min as Lee Hye-kyung
Yoo Seo-jin as Yoon Hyun-soo
Choi Sang-hoon as Kang Ho-sang
Lee Won as Kwon Oh-suk
Lee Sung-min as Song Soo-chul 
Lee Dal-hyung as Park Bong-shik
Yeo Ho-min as Hong Seo-gyu
Kim Dong-gyun as Noh Yong-chul
Park Joo-ah as Park Hyung-ja
Shin Dong-woo as Kim Joon-hee 
Lee Chul-min as Kim Hak-seon
Kang Joo-hyung as Ahn Da-jung
Jin Sung as Lee Won
Im Hyun-sung as Kim Beom-rae
Sung Woo-jin as Ra Seok-hyun
Ricky Kim as Aidan Lee
Lee Chae-won as Seung-ah's makeup artist
Lee Kyung-jin as Kwak Wook-shim 
Min Seo-hyun as Yang So-eun
Seol Ji-yoon as Writer Kwon
Kang Rae-yeon as travel guide
Maeng Bo-hak as movie producer
Yoon Seol-hee as room salon girl
Lee Seung-hyung as advertiser
Son Hwa-ryung
Kim Sung-oh as SW manager
Yoon Gi-won as fake manager (ep 1-2)
Kim Ki-soo as Young-eun's tango teacher (ep 1)

Special appearances

Lee Sun-kyun as himself (ep 1)
Bae Jong-ok as herself (ep 1)
Park Jin-hee as herself (ep 1)
Choi Min-hwan as himself (ep 1)
Lee Hong-gi as himself (ep 1)
Lee Jae-jin as himself (ep 1)
Lee Hyo-ri as herself (ep 1)
Ji Il-joo as Lee Hyo-ri's manager (ep 1)
Kim Ji-young as herself (ep 1)
Jeon Do-yeon as herself (ep 2)
Park Si-yeon as herself (ep 3)
Lee Chun-hee as himself (ep 3)
Jeon Hye-bin as herself (ep 3)
Kim Min-jun as himself (ep 4)
Kang Hye-jung as herself (ep 5,12)
Uhm Ji-won as herself (ep 5)
Lee Seo-jin as himself (ep 9)
Song Chang-eui as himself (ep 11)
Lee Dong-gyu as health center employee (ep 14)
Shin Dong-wook as drama actor (ep 14)
Kim Je-dong as himself (ep 15)
Kim Jung-eun as herself (ep 16)
Yoon Se-ah as screenwriter (ep 21)
Kim Sung-min as manager (ep 21)
Hines Ward as himself (ep 21)

Production
The series features 27 cameo appearances, among them are Jeon Do-yeon, Kim Jung-eun, Lee Seo-jin, Kim Min-jun and Yoon Se-ah, who had previously worked with writer Kim Eun-sook and director Shin Woo-chul on Lovers in Paris, Lovers in Prague, and Lovers. Song Yoon-ah also asked her celebrity friends to appear on the show, namely Lee Hyori, Kang Hye-jung, Uhm Ji-won, and comedian Kim Je-dong.

Parts of the series were filmed on location in Taiwan, where the character Lee Kyung-min goes in search of Seo Young-eun, who went to Taiwan on vacation.

Soundtrack
Information
Title: 온에어 OST Part 2 / On Air OST Part 2
Artist: Various Artists
Language: Korean, English
Release Date: 2008-Apr-29
Number of Tracks: 11
Publisher: Unknown
Agency: Sony Music

Track Listing

Awards and nominations

International broadcast
The series aired on Mnet Japan beginning July 30, 2008. Park Yong-ha and Song Yoon-ah visited Japan to promote it in a showcase attend by 800 VIP guests at Toho Cinema in Roppongi Hills, Tokyo.

References

External links
 On Air official SBS website 
 

Seoul Broadcasting System television dramas
2008 South Korean television series debuts
2008 South Korean television series endings
Korean-language television shows
South Korean romance television series
South Korean comedy-drama television series
Television shows written by Kim Eun-sook